Craftsbury Common is an unincorporated village in the town of Craftsbury, Orleans County, Vermont, United States. Craftsbury Common has a post office with ZIP code 05827.

References

Unincorporated communities in Orleans County, Vermont
Unincorporated communities in Vermont